Bulbophyllum macrocarpum is a species of orchid in the genus Bulbophyllum.

References

The Bulbophyllum-Checklist
The Internet Orchid Species Photo Encyclopedia

macrocarpum